Andrea Laura Vila Pereira (born January 30, 1987) mostly known as Andy Vila, is an Uruguayan actress, model and television presenter.

Early life 
Andrea Vila was born on January 30, 1987, in Montevideo, Uruguay. She attended Elbio Fernández School. Her relatives already knew in her childhood that she was going to be an "artist."

Career 
At just 7 years old, she began attending theater classes. She began working on advertisements, catwalks and photo campaigns. At age 18 she attended his first casting, which was in El Show del Mediodía broadcast on Telecoce. In it she was a host assistant. The following year, after the success she had in the previous program, she was summoned to participate in the Uruguayan soap opera, La Oveja Negra, and in the film 14 días en el paraíso. That same year she started presenting Click on Nuevo Siglo TV.

In 2008, Vila participated in two Uruguayan soap operas, El Lolo, playing Natalia, and Los profesionales del espectáculo. The next year, she co-starred in the movie Bad Day for Fishing, portraying Maria Victoria. In 2011 he was a recurring character in Adicciones. The next year he gave life to Lydia in the movie La culpa del cordero. In the summer of 2012-2013, she served as a reporter for the Uruguayan show Verano Perfecto and the Argentine Bien de Verano. In 2013, Vila made her premiere at the theater with Encadenados, where she toured the entire country. In 2014, she continued in Verano Perfecto but with a new, leading role. Between 2015 and 2017 she was a panelist for the morning television show Desayunos informales. Between September 2018 and January 2019 ellan presented the Modo avión travel program, broadcast on Channel 4. Since December 3, 2018, she co-hosts Vamo Arriba, a daytime television show, also broadcast on Channel 4. Since September 2021, he hosts the game show Los 8 escalones - Celebrities Edition, a spin-off featuring celebrities. Vila left Vamo Arriba on December 16, 2022, claiming that she wanted to dedicate herself to caring for her newborn daughter.

Filmography

Television

Movies

Theater

Personal life 
Vila began a relationship with Emiliano Álvarez in 2013. They separated in May 2019, but got back together in July 2020. On November 22, 2021, during the live broadcast of Vamo Arriba, she announced that she was pregnant with her first child.

References

External links 

 
 

1987 births
Living people
21st-century Uruguayan actresses
Uruguayan female models
Uruguayan film actresses
Uruguayan television presenters
Uruguayan stage actresses
Uruguayan television actresses